Gutkeled (spelling variants: Gut-Keled, Guthkeled, Guth-Keled) was the name of a gens (Latin for "clan"; nemzetség in Hungarian) in the Kingdom of Hungary, to which a number of Hungarian noble families belong.

History
The primary source of their origins is the Gesta Hungarorum of Simon of Kéza, in which the author writes: 

Sed postea, tempore Petri regis Kelad et Gut intrant tres frateres ex gente Svevorum procreati. De castello Stof sunt nativi.
″But afterwards, during the reign of king Peter, Kelad and Gut three brothers of Swabian descent immigrated. They were born at the castle of Stof.″

The castle "Stof" is assumed to be a corruption of Stauf, meaning either castle Stauf in Staufen im Breisgau or the Hohenstaufen castle in Württemberg. The king mentioned is Péter Orseolo, placing the arrival of the Gutkeleds to Hungary sometime around the 1040s.

Noble families 
Some of the Hungarian noble families descending from the Gutkeleds are:
 Adonyi
 Apagyi
 Atyai
 Báthory
 Benyó
 Daróczi
 Diószegi
 Dobi
 Gacsályi
 Guthi
 Kenézy
 Kun
 Országs ( Horsák )
 Pelbárthidi
 Rozsályi
 Szemesi
 Maróthy
 Várdai

Notable members
 Apaj Gutkeled, Ban of Slavonia (1237–1239)
 Nicholas I Gutkeled, Ban of Slavonia (1240–1241), killed in the Battle of Mohi
 Stephen I Gutkeled, Ban of Slavonia (1248–1259)
 Nicholas II Gutkeled, Ban of Slavonia (1278–1279)
 Joachim Gutkeled, Ban of Slavonia (died in April 1277)

Notes

External links 
 One of the Guthkeled coat-of-arms, similar devices were later used by most of the families.

References 

Gutkeled clan
Hungarian people of German descent